The Crippled God is the tenth and final volume of Canadian author Steven Erikson's epic fantasy series, the Malazan Book of the Fallen.

Development
In a 2014 Q&A with Tor, Erikson says he considers Dust of Dreams and The Crippled God to be two halves of a single, concluding book.

Plot
Immediately following the events of Dust of Dreams, Adjunct Tavore leads the Bonehunters further into the Letherii wastelands.

Critical Reception
The Crippled God debuted at #12 on The New York Times best sellers list.

Bill Capossere described the novel as "the closing chapter of a work that I believe stands as the preeminent fantasy of the past 20 years and belongs high up on the short list of best ever."

The British Fantasy Society praises the novel, describing it as "heroic fantasy that’s been dragged through the mud and kicked a few times [...] and it’s all the better for it."

SFFWorld calls it "action-packed, compelling and full of wonderful scenes for the fans" but is critical of the lack of resolution in some plot threads.

Fantasy Book Review gave it a 10 out of 10, calling it "the perfect finale to one of the greatest literary achievements of the last hundred years."

References

Malazan Book of the Fallen
Tor Books books
High fantasy novels
2011 Canadian novels
Novels by Steven Erikson
Bantam Books books